Crazy Lake is a lake in Fresno County, California, in the United States.

Crazy Lake was so named by a biologist who, noting the lack of scenery, wrote "anyone visiting this lake is crazy".

See also
List of lakes in California

References

Lakes of Fresno County, California
Lakes of California
Lakes of Northern California